Todd Goldstein (born 1 July 1988) is an Australian rules footballer playing for the North Melbourne Football Club in the Australian Football League (AFL).  Goldstein is a ruckman who wears the number 22, and was drafted from the Oakleigh Chargers with the 37th selection in the 2006 AFL Draft. In 2015 he became the first-ever player to reach 1000 hitouts in a season. He surpassed Aaron Sandilands for the most hitouts in VFL/AFL history in Round 17, 2021. Todd attended Preshil during primary school and Trinity Grammar School (Victoria) during high school.

Junior career

Goldstein stands at 201 cm, and has a basketball background, where he represented Australia at Under-19 level.  Goldstein was a member of the Oakleigh Chargers 2006 side that won the TAC Cup.

Goldstein kicked a goal with his first kick for Victorian Football League side Tasmanian Devils Football Club in 2007.

Goldstein played his junior basketball at Balwyn Blazers and Nunawading Spectres. He moved to football in 2006, playing for the Oakleigh Chargers and nominated for the AFL draft in that same year.

AFL career
Goldstein was brought into the North Melbourne side for their Round 15 clash with the Port Adelaide Power at AAMI Stadium in 2008.  He made his AFL debut in this game, where he collected four disposals and won 13 hitouts.  In the next round, Goldstein kicked two goals against the Collingwood Magpies.

Goldstein played one of the best games of his career to date against the Melbourne Demons in the round 19, 2009 match at Etihad Stadium. He finished with 5 goals, 25 hitouts and helped his teammates to a 10-goal win.  He was awarded two Brownlow Medal votes for this game.

In 2010 he played in 21 of 22 games, and often had to ruck for long periods, due to injuries to the Kangaroos other ruckmen, Hamish McIntosh, David Hale and Drew Petrie.

In 2011 he has taken over the number one ruck duties at North Melbourne in the absence of McIntosh and has begun to establish himself as one of the leagues premier big men. In the round 10 match against the Sydney Swans he set a career best record of 53 hitouts which he equaled again just 4 weeks later.

By 2015 he has established himself as an elite ruckman, ranking as the number 1 ruck in the competition and number 4 player overall. In a poll by AFL.com in May, 81% of respondents considered him the best current ruck in the AFL. His season was rewarded with the Syd Barker Medal as North Melbourne's best-and-fairest player.
Also in the season of 2015, Goldstein became the first player in AFL history to garner 1000 hitouts in a single season, and in round 12 against Greater Western Sydney broke the record of most hitouts in a single game with 80 total.

Statistics
 Statistics are correct to the end of 2019

|- style="background-color: #EAEAEA"
! scope="row" style="text-align:center" | 2008
|
| 22 || 3 || 2 || 0 || 8 || 8 || 16 || 6 || 4 || 29 || 0.7 || 0.0 || 2.7 || 2.7 || 5.3 || 2.0 || 1.3 || 9.7 || 0
|-
! scope="row" style="text-align:center" | 2009
|
| 22 || 13 || 9 || 4 || 45 || 59 || 104 || 36 || 18 || 179 || 0.7 || 0.3 || 3.5 || 4.5 || 8.0 || 2.8 || 1.4 || 13.8 || 2
|- style="background-color: #EAEAEA"
! scope="row" style="text-align:center" | 2010
|
| 22 || 21 || 10 || 12 || 123 || 121 || 244 || 90 || 70 || 367 || 0.5 || 0.6 || 5.9 || 5.8 || 11.6 || 4.3 || 3.3 || 17.5 || 0
|-
! scope="row" style="text-align:center" | 2011
|
| 22 || 21 || 13 || 6 || 151 || 137 || 288 || 73 || 92 || 741 || 0.6 || 0.3 || 7.2 || 6.5 || 13.7 || 3.5 || 4.4 || 35.3 || 6
|- style="background-color: #EAEAEA"
! scope="row" style="text-align:center" | 2012
|
| 22 || 21 || 2 || 4 || 114 || 143 || 257 || 56 || 53 || 663 || 0.1 || 0.2 || 5.4 || 6.8 || 12.2 || 2.7 || 2.5 || 31.6 || 6
|-
! scope="row" style="text-align:center" | 2013
|
| 22 || 22 || 13 || 4 || 113 || 150 || 263 || 66 || 65 || 822 || 0.6 || 0.2 || 5.1 || 6.8 || 12.0 || 3.0 || 3.0 || 37.4 || 7
|- style="background-color: #EAEAEA"
! scope="row" style="text-align:center" | 2014
|
| 22 || 24 || 10 || 7 || 98 || 190 || 288 || 52 || 114 || 838 || 0.4 || 0.3 || 4.1 || 7.9 || 12.0 || 2.2 || 4.8 || 34.9 || 3
|-
! scope="row" style="text-align:center" | 2015
|
| 22 || 24 || 11 || 10 || 157 || 195 || 352 || 100 || 102 || 1058 || 0.4 || 0.4 || 6.5 || 8.1 || 14.6 || 4.1 || 4.2 || 44.1 || 18
|- style="background-color: #EAEAEA"
! scope="row" style="text-align:center" | 2016
|
| 22 || 22 || 20 || 7 || 128 || 175 || 303 || 69 || 69 || 804 || 0.9 || 0.3 || 5.8 || 7.9 || 13.7 || 3.5 || 3.5 || 36.5 || 11
|-
! scope="row" style="text-align:center" | 2017
|
| 22 || 19 || 12 || 6 || 94 || 161 || 255 || 54 || 55 || 576 || 0.6 || 0.3 || 4.9 || 8.5 || 13.4 || 2.8 || 2.9 || 30.3 || 0
|- style="background-color: #EAEAEA"
! scope="row" style="text-align:center" | 2018
|
| 22 || 22 || 12 || 5 || 139 || 181 || 320 || 74 || 63 || 783 || 0.5 || 0.2 || 6.3 || 8.2 || 14.5 || 3.4 || 2.9 || 35.6 || 6
|-
! scope="row" style="text-align:center" | 2019
|
| 22 || 22 || 5 || 7 || 139 || 230 || 369 || 62 || 38 || 737 || 0.2 || 0.3 || 6.3 || 10.5 || 16.8 || 2.8 || 1.7 || 33.5 || 5
|- class="sortbottom"
! colspan=3| Career
! 234
! 119
! 72
! 1309
! 1750
! 3059
! 738
! 743
! 7597
! 0.5
! 0.3
! 5.6
! 7.5
! 13.1
! 3.2
! 3.2
! 32.5
! 64
|}

Personal life 
Son of Andrea and Jeff, and brother of Luke and Kye, Todd grew up in the inner south eastern suburbs of Melbourne. His schooling involved attending Trinity Grammar School (in secondary school) and Preshil (in primary school).

Goldstein is currently studying a juris doctor at Deakin University. He had previously completed a Bachelor of Applied Management.

Footnotes

External links

1988 births
Living people
Australian rules footballers from Victoria (Australia)
People educated at Trinity Grammar School, Kew
North Melbourne Football Club players
Oakleigh Chargers players
All-Australians (AFL)
Australian people of Jewish descent
Syd Barker Medal winners
North Ballarat Football Club players
Tasmanian Devils Football Club players